is a Japanese comedian, actor, singer and artist. He is the short member of the comedy duo Tunnels, with whom he was a member of the pop group Yaen. His partner is Takaaki Ishibashi. He is the executive vice president of the entertainment office Arrival.

Kinashi's wife is actress Narumi Yasuda. His cousin is Liberal Democratic Party Suginami lawmaker Morisho Kinashi.

Works

Creations
Kinashi had seven solo exhibitions by 2013. His style of painting is abstract based on the color red, sketching letters in landscapes, and still life drawings with simple color expression. While using his exhibitions via the interactive method of the Internet, he can also handle character designs in video games.

Discography

Delivery

Videos

Filmography
 (except guest appearance programmes)

Current appearances

Former appearances

TV programmes
Regular programmes

Special programmes
Only for clarification (excluding guest appearance programmes)

TV dramas

Film

Animated films

Stage

Bibliography

References

External links
 

Japanese impressionists (entertainers)
Japanese television presenters
Japanese male singers
Japanese male voice actors
Japanese businesspeople
Comedians from Tokyo
Male actors from Tokyo
1962 births
Living people